The commune of Agen is the prefecture of the Lot-et-Garonne department in Nouvelle-Aquitaine, southwestern France.

Geography
The city of Agen lies in the southwestern department of Lot-et-Garonne in the Aquitaine region. The city centre lies on the east bank of the river Garonne, the Canal de Garonne flows through the city, approximately halfway between Bordeaux  and Toulouse .

Climate
Agen features an oceanic climate (Cfb), in the Köppen climate classification. Winters are mild and feature cool to cold temperatures while summers are mild and warm. Rainfall is spread equally throughout the year; however, most sunshine hours are from March–September.

Toponymy
From Occitan Agen (1197), itself from Latin Aginnum (3rd century Itinéraire d'Antonin), from a Celtic root agin- meaning "rock or height".

Population

Economy
The town has a higher level of unemployment than the national average. Major employers include the pharmaceutical factory UPSA.

Sights

The old centre of town contains a number of medieval buildings.

The twelfth century Agen Cathedral, dedicated to Saint Caprasius, is one of the few large churches in France with a double nave, a regional trait also found in the Church of the Jacobins in nearby Toulouse.

The Saint Hilaire church, dedicated to the theme of the Holy Trinity which the Saint in question did a lot to defend, is notable for its unusual statues in front of the Church – Moses on the right, and St Peter on the left.

The art gallery contains several hundred works, including several by Goya, and others by Bonnard and Seurat. The collection also contains a large number of works by artists who lived locally. The museum is made up of twenty or so rooms.

The Canal des Deux Mers, which joins the Mediterranean with the Atlantic, crosses the river Garonne at Agen via the town's famous canal bridge.

Colour photography pioneer

Louis Arthur Ducos du Hauron (1837 – 1920), a pioneer of colour photography lived and worked in Agen. He developed practical processes for colour photography on the three-colour principle, using both additive and subtractive methods. In 1868 he patented his ideas (French Patent No. 83061) and in 1869 he published them in Les couleurs en photographie, solution du problème.

The most widely reproduced of his surviving colour photographs is the View of Agen, an 1877 landscape, printed by the subtractive assembly method which he pioneered. Several different photographs of the view from his attic window, one dated 1874, also survive.

Entertainment
The municipal theatre "Théâtre Ducourneau" presents theatre, and occasionally classical concerts. The smaller "Théâtre du jour" has a resident theatre company presenting a variety of recent or older plays (Shakespeare, Beckett, as well as lesser known playwrights).

There are two cinemas, one a commercial multiscreened affair, the other an arts cinema run by a voluntary organization. The latter organizes film festivals every year.

Sport
Rugby is extremely popular in the town, and the local team, SU Agen, is enthusiastically supported. The town also serves as the base for the Team Lot-et-Garonne cycling team.

Transport
The Gare d'Agen connects Agen with Toulouse and Bordeaux as well as Périgueux. It is around an hour from Toulouse and around an hour from Bordeaux. The TGV train to Paris takes three hours and thirteen minutes with a stop in Bordeaux.

Agen is connected, by the A62 autoroute, to both Toulouse and Bordeaux.

The Agen Airport is serviced by Airlinair service to Paris Orly 6 days a week. It is also used for business and leisure flying.

Agen stands on the voie verte cycle path between the Mediterranean and close to Bordeaux.

Diocese

Agen is the seat of a Roman Catholic diocese that comprises the Département of Lot and Garonne. It is a suffragan of the archdiocese of Bordeaux.

Twin towns – sister cities

Agen is twinned with:
 Corpus Christi, United States
 Dinslaken, Germany
 Galena, Illinois, United States
 Llanelli, Wales, United Kingdom
 Toledo, Spain
 Tuapse, Russia

Notable people
As place of birth
Bernard Palissy (c. 1510–1590), potter – according to some accounts, he may have been born in Saintes
Joseph Justus Scaliger (1540–1609), scholar
Pierre Dupuy (1582–1651), scholar
Francés de Corteta (1586-1667), nobleman and poet
Joseph Barsalou (1600–1660), physician
Godefroi, Comte d'Estrades (1607–1686), diplomatist and marshal
Bernard Germain de Lacépède (1756–1825), naturalist
Jean Baptiste Bory de Saint-Vincent (1780–1846), naturalist
Jacques Jasmin (1798–1864), Provençal poet
Victor Rabu (1834–1907), architect who built many important churches in Montevideo, Uruguay
Joseph Chaumié (1849–1919), politician
William Grover-Williams (1903–1945) racer and SOE agent
Michel Serres (born 1930), philosopher and author
Jacques Sadoul (born 1934), author
Jean Cruguet (born 1939), jockey who won the U.S. Triple Crown of thoroughbred racing
Alain Aspect (born 1947), physicist
Francis Cabrel (born 1953), singer-songwriter and guitarist
Bernard Campan (born 1958), actor and film director
Emmanuel Flipo (born 1958), artist
Stéphane Rideau (born 1976), actor
Aymeric Laporte (born 1994), footballer

As residence
Julius Caesar Scaliger In 1525 he became physician to Antonio della Rovera, bishop of Agen, and remained until his death in 1558.
Nostradamus lived in Agen from 1531 until at least 1534. He was married to a local woman with whom he had two children.

Miscellaneous
Agen is the "capital of the prune", a local product consumed as a sweet, either stuffed with prune purée or in pastries, or as a dessert, e.g., prunes soaked in Armagnac, a type of brandy. On the last weekend of August, a prune festival comprises rock concerts, circus performances and prune tastings.

Jewish presence
The first Jews settled in the town in the twelfth century AD. They were expelled from the town in 1306. A number of Jews returned to the town in 1315, and a "Rue des Juifs" is documented ever since this period. In 1968, about 600 Jews lived in the town, though most of them had emigrated from North Africa. A Jewish synagogue still exists in the town.

See also
 SU Agen Lot-et-Garonne, a French rugby union club based in Agen
 Agenais, or Agenois, a former province of France
 Tulipa agenensis, a red tulip named after a wild colony growing near the town

References

External links

 Site de la ville
 Office de tourisme
 Diocese of Agen – Catholic Encyclopædia article

 
Communes of Lot-et-Garonne
Prefectures in France
Gallia Aquitania
Agenais
Lot-et-Garonne communes articles needing translation from French Wikipedia